Christian H. "Chris" Oberth (died July 16, 2012) was a game programmer who created early titles for the Apple II family of personal computers, handheld electronic games for Milton Bradley, and games for coin-operated arcade machines published in the early 1980s. Though not a hit in arcades, Oberth's 1982 Anteater for Stern Electronics was an influential concept, cloned by a number of developers for 8-bit home computers, including Sierra On-Line as Oil's Well. The following year he wrote his own home version as Ardy the Aardvark (Datamost, 1983).

Oberth's first commercial games, Phasor Zap (1978) and 3-D Docking Mission (1978) for the Apple II, were published by Programma International, a company which also published games from future arcade game designers Bob Flanagan and Gary Shannon as well as rejecting the first effort from Mark Turmell. His next thirteen Apple II games, in addition to Phasor Zap and 3-D Docking Mission, were published by The Elektrik Keyboard, a musical instrument and computer store in Chicago where Oberth was head of the computer department.

Games

References 

Video game programmers
2012 deaths